Nogometni klub Brinje Grosuplje, commonly referred to as Brinje Grosuplje, is a Slovenian football club which plays in the town of Grosuplje.

History
NK Brinje Grosuplje was founded in 2003. The club is legally not considered to be the successor of NK Grosuplje and the statistics and honours of the two clubs are kept separate by the Football Association of Slovenia.

Honours
Slovenian Third League (West)
 Winners: 2021–22

References

External links
Official website 
Globalsportsarchive.com profile

Association football clubs established in 2003
Football clubs in Slovenia
2003 establishments in Slovenia